Falls Township, Ohio, may refer to:
Falls Township, Hocking County, Ohio
Falls Township, Muskingum County, Ohio

See also
 Fallsbury Township, Licking County, Ohio

Ohio township disambiguation pages